Dakshineswar railway station is a Kolkata Suburban Railway station of Eastern Railway. Dankuni and Bardhaman local train connects this place to Sealdah Station and other stations of the Sealdah main line. It is an important railway station between Dum Dum and Dankuni railway stations.

History 
Sealdah–Dankuni line was opened in 1932 by the Eastern Bengal Railway. The line was electrified in 1965.

The station

Station layout

Platform layout

Track layout

Major trains
 Sealdah–Alipurduar Kanchan Kanya Express
 Sealdah–Bamanhat Uttar Banga Express
 Sealdah–Silchar Kanchenjunga Express
Kolkata–Jammu Tawi Express
 Sealdah–Agartala Kanchenjunga Express
Kolkata - Darbhanga Maithili Express

References

Railway stations in North 24 Parganas district
Sealdah railway division
Kolkata Suburban Railway stations
1865 establishments in British India
Railway stations opened in 1865